IROC V was the fifth year of IROC competition, which took place over three weekends in 1977 and 1978. It saw the use of the Chevrolet Camaro in all races, and the schedule was held over in its entirety from IROC IV. Al Unser won two races en route to the championship and $50,000.

The roster of drivers and final points standings were as follows:

Race results

Michigan International Speedway, Race One

 Al Unser
 Cale Yarborough
 Darrell Waltrip
 Richard Petty
 Gunnar Nilsson
 Gordon Johncock
 Mario Andretti
 Johnny Rutherford
 Benny Parsons
 Al Holbert
 Tom Sneva
 Jacky Ickx

Riverside International Raceway, Race Two

 Al Unser
 Richard Petty
 Gordon Johncock
 Mario Andretti
 Darrell Waltrip
 Gunnar Nilsson
 Johnny Rutherford
 Jacky Ickx
 Benny Parsons
 Cale Yarborough
 Al Holbert
 Tom Sneva

Riverside International Raceway, Race Three

 Cale Yarborough
 Mario Andretti
 Al Unser
 Darrell Waltrip
 Richard Petty
 Gunnar Nilsson
 Jacky Ickx
 Benny Parsons
 Johnny Rutherford
 Gordon Johncock
 Tom Sneva
 Al Holbert

Daytona International Speedway, Race Four

 Mario Andretti
 Darrell Waltrip
 Gordon Johncock
 Cale Yarborough
 Benny Parsons
 Jacky Ickx
 Al Unser
 Richard Petty
 Johnny Rutherford

References

External links
IROC V History - IROC Website

International Race of Champions
1977 in American motorsport 
1978 in American motorsport